David Campbell is a Canadian Olympic middle-distance runner. He represented his country in the men's 1500 meters at the 1992 Summer Olympics. His time was a 3:42.97 in the first heat.

References

1960 births
Living people
Athletes (track and field) at the 1987 Pan American Games
Athletes (track and field) at the 1988 Summer Olympics
Canadian male middle-distance runners
Olympic track and field athletes of Canada
Sportspeople from Halifax, Nova Scotia
Commonwealth Games medallists in athletics
Commonwealth Games bronze medallists for Canada
Athletes (track and field) at the 1986 Commonwealth Games
Pan American Games track and field athletes for Canada
Medallists at the 1986 Commonwealth Games